Yoo Byung-ok (born 2 March 1964) is a South Korean football defender who played for South Korea in the 1986 FIFA World Cup. He also played for Hanyang University.

References

External links
 
 

1964 births
South Korean footballers
South Korea international footballers
Association football defenders
Pohang Steelers players
FC Seoul players
K League 1 players
Hanyang University alumni
1986 FIFA World Cup players
Living people
Asian Games medalists in football
Footballers at the 1986 Asian Games
Asian Games gold medalists for South Korea
Medalists at the 1986 Asian Games